Le Cordon Bleu College of Culinary Arts Atlanta was a two-year private for-profit college in Georgia. The college was owned by Career Education Corporation under a licensing agreement with Le Cordon Bleu in Paris. The branch campus was established in April 2003 and all US Cordon Bleu College locations closed in September 2017.

Academics 
There were four programs offered at Le Cordon Bleu College of Culinary Arts Atlanta; both tracks focus on classical cooking methods, all facets of food preparation, and baking skills.

Associate
 Le Cordon Bleu Culinary Arts
 Le Cordon Bleu Pâtisserie and Baking

Certificate
 Le Cordon Bleu Culinary Arts
 Le Cordon Bleu Pâtisserie and Baking

Admissions 
Requirements for admission in Le Cordon Bleu College of Culinary Arts - Atlanta were proof of high school graduation, application, and personal interview.

Campus 
The school's campus featured professional kitchens with industry-current equipment and an on-site restaurant. The college library also offered an assortment of books, periodicals, videos and computer labs for student use.

Accreditation 
Le Cordon Bleu College of Culinary Arts Atlanta was accredited by the Accrediting Council for Independent Colleges and Schools (ACICS). Since it did not have regional accreditation, many regionally accredited schools are reluctant to accept its credits in transfer or recognize its degrees for entry into graduate programs.

References 

Cooking schools in the United States
Educational institutions established in 2003
Career Education Corporation
Educational institutions disestablished in 2017
Defunct private universities and colleges in Georgia (U.S. state)
2003 establishments in Georgia (U.S. state)